The Philatelic Exporter, established May 1945, is a trade magazine produced for the international stamp trade. It is published monthly by Stanley Gibbons who acquired the title in January 2009 from Heritage Studios Limited. The current editor is Alison Boyd. Previous editors included Arthur Stansfield followed by Graham Phillips.

References

External links
Official website
The Philatelic Exporter archive at Internet Archive

1945 establishments in the United Kingdom
Monthly magazines published in the United Kingdom
English-language magazines
Magazines established in 1945
Philatelic periodicals
Professional and trade magazines
Stanley Gibbons
Business magazines published in the United Kingdom